Alexander Borisovich Mayorov (born June 6, 1957) is a former Soviet Nordic combined skier who competed in the early 1980s. He finished sixth in the individual event at the 1980 Winter Olympics in Lake Placid. He won a bronze medal in the 3x10 km team event at the 1984 FIS Nordic World Ski Championships in Rovaniemi.

Mayorov finished 14th in the individual event at the 1984 Winter Olympics in Sarajevo. His best individual finish was 7th in East Germany in 1983.

External links

Soviet male Nordic combined skiers
Nordic combined skiers at the 1980 Winter Olympics
Olympic Nordic combined skiers of the Soviet Union
Nordic combined skiers at the 1984 Winter Olympics
1957 births
Living people
FIS Nordic World Ski Championships medalists in Nordic combined